Catephia compsotrephes is a species of moth of the family Erebidae first described by Alfred Jefferis Turner in 1932. It is found in north-western Australia.

The wingspan is about 46 mm. The forewings are dark fuscous with a few bluish-white scales. There is an obscurely darker transverse line, as well as two obscure dark spots in the middle, arranged transversely. There is also a blackish line from the costa obliquely outwards, describing a rounded curve in the disc, thence sinuate inwards to the dorsum. The hindwings are white with a broad fuscous terminal band containing three elongate white spots, as well as a white streak on the apex.

References

Catephia
Moths described in 1932
Moths of Australia